The 2009-10 Coppa Titano was the fiftieth season of San Marino's oldest football competition. It began on 12 September 2009 with the first games of the Group Stage and ended in 2010 with the Final held at Stadio Olimpico, Serravalle. Juvenes/Dogana were the defending champions, having won their eighth cup final last season.

Tre Fiori defeated Tre Penne 2–1 in extra time in the final, thereby earning at least a place in the first qualifying round of the 2010–11 UEFA Europa League. They have since been promoted to the second qualifying round because Atlético Madrid, winners of the 2009–10 Europa League, are also assured of qualifying domestically for the 2010–11 Europa League through the Copa del Rey. Tre Fiori can instead qualify for the first qualifying round of the 2010–11 UEFA Champions League by winning the 2009–10 Campionato Sammarinese di Calcio, in which they are currently in the semifinals.

Competition format
The competition consists of two stages, the Group Stage and the Elimination Rounds. The Group Stage consists of three groups with five teams each. Every team plays two games (once home and once away) against every other team of its group. The top two teams from each group, as well as the two best third-placed teams, qualify for the Elimination Rounds. The Elimination Rounds are a single-game elimination tournament. Games in the Elimination Rounds are decided by extra time and, if necessary, a penalty shootout.

Group stage

Group A

Group B

Group C

Elimination rounds

Quarterfinals
These matches were played on 21 April 2010.

Semifinals
These matches were played on 24 April 2010.

Final

References

External links
 Official website 

Coppa Titano seasons
San Marino
Coppa